Libi Rana (Nivedita) was an Indian actress who had acted in Bollywood films like Dharti Kahe Pukar Ke, Shagoon, Jaan (1996), Rocky Mera Naam (1973) and Bank Robbery (1969).

References 

Hindi cinema